The Government Ayurveda Medical College Kannur is situated in Pariyaram, Kannur. It is one of the three Ayurveda medical colleges in Kerala. The college has 150 bed strength. There are 14 clinical departments functioning there; they offer one UG course, a Bachelor's in Ayurvedic Medicine and Surgery.and 5 PG Courses and 1 Diploma Course, Certificate Courses in Ayurveda Therapist and Nursing. In the Kerala University of Health Sciences' North Zone arts festival, they emerged in second place.

References

External links

Ayurvedic colleges in Kerala
Universities and colleges in Kannur district
Educational institutions established in 1998
1998 establishments in Kerala
Kannur
Colleges affiliated to Kannur University